Anorituup Kangerlua, also known as Anoritoq or Anortek Fjord, is a fjord in King Frederick VI Coast, southern Greenland.

Geography
{ "type": "ExternalData", "service": "geoshape", "ids": "Q24727763", "properties": { "fill": "#0050d0"}}

This fjord marks the border between the Sermersooq municipality to the north and the Kujalleq municipality to the south in the eastern coast of Greenland.

Anorituup Kangerlua extends in a roughly E/W direction for about 50 km between Napasorsuaq Fjord to the north and Avaqqat Kangerluat Fjord to the south. Kangikitsua is a tributary fjord branching on the southern shore within the fjord. To the east Anorituup Kangerlua opens into the North Atlantic Ocean. The Qulleq group of coastal islands lies to the northeast of the northern end of its mouth. 

The Akia Peninsula is at the southern end of its mouth and the Anorituup Qeqertag islet cluster at its northern end. Off the southern side of the entrance is Isortoq Bay, with Nuuk Point at its eastern end. There are a number of large glaciers at his head.

Mountains

See also
List of fjords of Greenland

References

External links
Den grønlandske Lods - Sejladsanvisninger Østgrønland
New insights on the north-eastern part of the Ketilidian orogen in South-East Greenland

Fjords of Greenland